Berzano di Tortona is a comune (municipality) in the Province of Alessandria in the Italian region Piedmont, located about  east of Turin and about  east of Alessandria, on the watershed between the Grue and Curone valleys.

Berzano di Tortona borders the following municipalities: Monleale, Sarezzano, Viguzzolo, and Volpeglino.

History 
Territory of the municipality of Tortona, it followed its destiny until 1818, when it became a commune. From 1928 to 1947 it was part of the municipality of Volpedo.

References

Cities and towns in Piedmont